Barrhaven Centre station is the southerly terminus of the Southwest Transitway in the Barrhaven neighbourhood of Ottawa, Ontario, Canada. It is the main western terminus of rapid route 75 for trips not coming from or heading to Cambrian, as well as rapid route 99 for most trips not coming from or heading to Citigate.

As part of the Stage 3 O-Train expansion to Barrhaven and Kanata, this station will be converted to light rail and will become the new western terminus for Line 1.

Service

The following routes serve Barrhaven Centre station as of September 2, 2021:

References

External links
Southwest Transit 2011 Version 4 Map

2011 establishments in Ontario
Transitway (Ottawa) stations